Sais is a Neotropical genus of clearwing (ithomiine) butterflies, named by Jacob Hübner in 1816. They are in the brush-footed butterfly family, Nymphalidae.

Species
Arranged alphabetically:
Sais browni Takahashi, 1977
Sais rosalia (Cramer, [1779])

References 

Ithomiini
Nymphalidae of South America
Nymphalidae genera
Taxa named by Jacob Hübner